Hudson Park High School is a public English medium co-educational high school situated in the suburb of Vincent in East London in the Eastern Cape province of South Africa, It is one of the top and most academic schools in East London and also one of the good rugby schools. The school was established in 1905.

The high school was known as Clifton Park in 1905, It is one of the most prestigious schools in Eastern Cape.

History 
A small primary school, catering for the Clifton area, was established in 1905 and housed in the St. Alban's Church hall. In 1912, buildings were erected on the present site and the school began to grow. It became a secondary school in 1959 and was named Clifton Park High School in 1965. It was during this period that the present uniform, badge and school song were established.

In 1978, the Primary Department amalgamated with Hudson Park Primary School and the school changed its name to Hudson Park High School. The Grade 7 class remained with the high school until 1985, at which time it was decided that the growth of the senior school required that Grade 7 should move to join the primary school. In 1991 the school opened its doors to pupils of all races.

1993 saw a new administration and classroom block, as well as new garages, and renovations were made to the entire school. Williams House was renovated to provide a music centre for the school. The extensions were opened in August 1994 by the Minister of Sport, Mr Steve Tshwete.

Sports
Sports offered by the school include:
 Archery 
 Athletics
 Chess
 Cricket
 Cross country
 Cycling 
 Hockey (Boys & Girls)
 Netball (Girls)
 Rowing
 Rugby (Boys)
 Football (soccer) 
 Squash
 Swimming
 Table tennis 
 Tennis
 Water polo

Notable alumni 
List of matriculants of Hudson Park High School are in alphabetical order.
 Scott Kemp (Class of 1992) South African rugby player 
 Akona Ndungane (Class of 1999) - South African rugby player 
 Odwa Ndungane (Class of 1999) - South African rugby player
 Andisa Gqobo (Class of 2005) - South African rugby player 
 Onke Dubase (Class of 2007) - South African rugby player
 Uzile Tele (Class of 2018)- South African rugby player
 Sibabalwe Mahashe (Class of 2022) South African rugby player
 Sivu Mabece (Class of 2022) South African rugby player

References

External links 
 

High schools in South Africa
Schools in the Eastern Cape
East London, Eastern Cape
Educational institutions established in 1905
1905 establishments in the Cape Colony